The Light Armored Vehicle (PBL) - Group project Inbrafiltro - is designed for special operations security, in which the troops need protection and great mobility.

History 
Designed entirely within the premises of Inbrafiltro, the VBL, the 3.5 ton class has the monobloc built in ballistic steel plate and is equipped with a shield against 7.62 NATO ammunition.
Structured totally on mechanical Land Rover / Defender, the vehicle has high operational mobility, and may also be equipped with various defensive items and / or attack, with the desired configuration by the customer.

The model was designed to have an autonomy of 640 km of highway and 400 in rough terrain, without a trailer and without using additional fuel tanks. The maximum load is around 1600 pounds, capable of transporting the driver and five soldiers.

The VBL has capacity for chemical defense, biological or radiological detection laser beam on the car, and low thermal signature, radar and noise. Another feature includes nocturnal mobility and ability to be airborne in pairs in C-130 aircraft used by the Brazilian air force. The car has six smoke grenades launchers arranged on the sides of the vehicle.

Versions
 Marine armored combat vehicles (ACV Fuz)
 Armored Combat Vehicle Heavy Mortar (VBC Mrt Pes)
 Light Armored Reconnaissance Vehicle (VBR LR)
 Light Armored Combat Vehicle anti-vehicle (ACV AC LR)
 Light Armored Vehicle Special Note Advanced (VBE OA LR)
 Light Armored Vehicle Combat Mortar (VBC Mrt LR)
 Light Armored Vehicle Special Radar (Rdr VBE LR)

Operators
:
01+ Military Police of Paraná State
01+ National Force of Public Safety

References

External links
http://www.militarypower.com.br/laad09_24.jpg
http://n.i.uol.com.br/ultnot/album//090414_armas_f_012.jpg
http://www.defesanet.com.br/01_lz/laad2009/imagens/inbra/vbl_drw.jpg

Armoured fighting vehicles of Brazil
21st-century military vehicles
Armoured cars
All-wheel-drive vehicles
Internal security vehicles
Paramilitary vehicles